Gilda García López born c. 1965 in Santiago de Veraguas, Veraguas (Panamá), is a Panamanian beauty pageant contestant winner of the Miss Panamá 1986 title. Also represented Panama in Miss Universe 1986, the 35th Miss Universe pageant was held at ATLAPA Convention Center, Panama City, Panama on July 21, 1986. She won the Best National Costume.

She represented Veraguas province.

References

External links
 Miss Panamá  official website

1960s births
Living people
Miss Universe 1986 contestants
Panamanian beauty pageant winners
Señorita Panamá